Sultan Idris Murshidul Azzam Shah Ibni Almarhum Raja Bendahara Alang Iskandar Marhum Teja  (19 June 1849 − 14 January 1916) was the 28th Sultan of Perak. Perak at that time was part of the British-administered Federated Malay States.

The Sultan's rule was marked by Perak joining the Federated Malay States, a Federation of four protected states in the Malay Peninsula, including Selangor, Negeri Sembilan and Pahang, established by the British government in 1895, which lasted until 1946.

Early life
Raja Idris Shah was born on 19 June 1849 at Kuala Keboi, Kampar, Perak. He was the son of Alang Iskandar.

He was the 27th Sultan of Perak. He succeeded his father-in-law, Sultan Yusuf Sharifuddin Muzaffar Shah, who died on 26 July 1887, and ruled until his death on 14 January 1916.

In March 1900, he opened the Victoria Bridge, a single track railway bridge located in Karai, Perak. It is one of the oldest railway bridges in Malaysia, having been constructed between December 1897 and March 1900 by the Perak State Railway as a crossing over the Perak River to serve the local tin mining industry.

He was appointed an Honorary Knight Commander of the Order of St Michael and St George (KCMG) in 1892, and received the Honorary Knight Grand Cross of the Order of St Michael and St George (GCMG) on 27 April 1901, in preparation of the forthcoming royal visit of the Duke and Duchess of Cornwall and York (later King George V and Queen Mary).

In 1902 he visited the United Kingdom to attend the Coronation of King Edward VII and Queen Alexandra, arriving at London in early June, and prolonging his stay until the autumn to be present for the rescheduled ceremony following the illness of the King.

Death
Upon returning to Perak in 1911, Sultan Idris health was under par and he rested at Port Dickson. Whilst recovering, he made a nazar, should he be restored a good health, he would build a mosque in Bukit Chandan. His vow later materialised with the erection of Ubudiah Mosque but he did not live to see it completed. Sultan Idris death on 14 January 1916 at the age of 66. He was interred at the Royal Mausoleum, Kuala Kangsar with the title of Marhum Rahmatullah. He was succeeded by his son Sultan Abdul Jalil Karamatullah Nasiruddin Mukhataram Shah Ibni Almarhum Sultan Idris Murshidul Azzam Shah Rahmatullah.

References

1849 births
1916 deaths
Sultans of Perak
Honorary Knights Grand Cross of the Order of St Michael and St George
Honorary Knights Grand Cross of the Royal Victorian Order
19th-century monarchs in Asia